Miehikkälä is a municipality of Finland. It is located in the province of Southern Finland and is part of the Kymenlaakso region. The municipality has a population of 
(), which make it the smallest municipality in Kymenlaakso in terms of population.
which 
is water. The population density is
.

Neighbouring municipalities are Hamina, Kouvola, Lappeenranta, Luumäki and Virolahti. The municipality is unilingually Finnish. According to Traficom, Miehikkälä is the fourth most motorized municipality in Finland with 629 cars per thousand inhabitants.

The coat of arms of the municipality representing the letter M (which refers to Miehikkälä's name) was designed by Tapio Vallioja in 1956.

Notable people
Sulo Nurmela, skier
Eeva Ruoppa, skier
Martti Urpalainen, marathonist
Reijo Taipale, singer

References

External links

Municipality of Miehikkälä – Official website 

Municipalities of Kymenlaakso
Populated places established in 1887